Henrik Koivisto (born 9 April 1990) is a Finnish professional ice hockey player. He is currently on a tryout contract for HIFK of the Finnish Liiga.

Koivisto made his Liiga debut playing with Jokerit during the 2013-14 Liiga season.

References

External links

1990 births
Living people
Kiekko-Vantaa players
Lukko players
Vaasan Sport players
Jokerit players
Finnish ice hockey forwards
People from Kerava
Sportspeople from Uusimaa